"There Goes My Life" is a song written by Wendell Mobley and Neil Thrasher and recorded by American country music singer Kenny Chesney.  It was released in October 2003 as the first single from Chesney's 2004 album When the Sun Goes Down. The song spent seven consecutive weeks at number one between late December 2003 and January 2004.

Content
The song is about a teen, who is blindsided when he finds out that his girlfriend is pregnant. He tells the audience that his dreams of skipping town after graduation and hanging out on the coast are ruined; in the chorus he sings, "There goes my life." By the next verse he is married to his girlfriend and their child is now a toddler. The boy discovers that it was all worth it in the end and that he loves his child more than anything. By the final verse, his daughter is grown up and going off to the West Coast herself. The father thinks as she drives away, "There goes my life, my future, my everything ..."

Music video
The music video was directed by Shaun Silva, and premiered on CMT on October 28, 2003. In the video, the protagonist is a high school football player, played by Austin Chittim. He is met after practice by his girlfriend, with news of her pregnancy. The couple decide to keep the baby, who becomes a source of happiness for them. When she grows up, she has to leave to pursue her education. The grown daughter in the video is played by actress Amber Heard, while the girlfriend in flashbacks is played by Meredith McCoy.

Chart performance
The song debuted at number 46 on the US Billboard Hot Country Singles & Tracks (now Hot Country Songs) chart for the week of October 25, 2003. It reached number one on that chart for the week of December 20, 2003 and held that position for seven consecutive weeks until it was knocked off by Alan Jackson's "Remember When". The song also peaked at number 29 on the Billboard Hot 100.

Year-end charts

Certifications

References

2003 singles
Country ballads
2000s ballads
Kenny Chesney songs
Songs written by Neil Thrasher
Songs written by Wendell Mobley
Music videos directed by Shaun Silva
Song recordings produced by Buddy Cannon
Song recordings produced by Norro Wilson
BNA Records singles
2003 songs
Songs about pregnancy